Garín is a town in Escobar Partido of Buenos Aires Province, Argentina. It is located in the north of the provincia de Buenos Aires

Attractions
 Museo de la ciudad de Garín. (Garín city museum)
 Plaza Central. (Central Park)

External links

 Garín website

Populated places in Buenos Aires Province
Escobar Partido